Green toad can refer to multiple species of toad, all formerly included in the genus Bufo:

Anaxyrus debilis, the North American green toad, from Mexico and the United States
Anaxyrus retiformis, the Sonoran green toad, from Mexico and the United States
Bufotes, the Eurasian green toads or Palearctic green toads, several species from Europe, Asia and northern Africa
Incilius coniferus, the evergreen toad, from Central and South America
Incilius melanochlorus, the dark green toad, from southern Central America

See also 
 Green frog (disambiguation)

Animal common name disambiguation pages